Inverugie railway station was a railway station in Inverugie, Aberdeenshire.

History
The station was opened on 3 July 1862 by the Formartine and Buchan Railway. On the north side was a siding and to the east was the signal box, which opened in 1894. It was closed to passengers under the Beeching Axe on 3 May 1965.

References

 

Disused railway stations in Aberdeenshire
Former Great North of Scotland Railway stations
Beeching closures in Scotland
Railway stations in Great Britain opened in 1862
Railway stations in Great Britain closed in 1965
1862 establishments in Scotland
1965 disestablishments in Scotland